Handcrafted America is an American TV series, which is broadcast on INSP. It is hosted by Jill Wagner, who travels across the United States visiting people with specialist crafts. Each episode, Wagner visits three different artists to discuss and study their craft.

The show first aired in 2015 and has a total of 39 episodes across three seasons. The entire series is available on Amazon Prime Video.

Synopsis
Each week, the show visits three different locations to interview and study certain specialist crafts. There is typically a range from ceramics to homemade products, to largescale productions of a particular item. In an interview, the host of the show Jill Wagner stated that she feels privileged to speak each week with people who have perfected their craft. The crafts on each episode are diverse, ranging from musical instruments, silverware, bicycles, glassware, and jewelry.

Cast
Each show is hosted by Jill Wagner. Each week, three guest artists and craftsmen and women are visited at their place of work.

Episodes

Series overview

Season 1 (2016)

Season 2 (2017)

Season 3 (2018)

References

2016 American television series debuts
2017 American television series endings
2010s American documentary television series